Avernes may refer to:
 Avernes, a commune in the Val-d'Oise department in France
 Avernes (wasp), a wasp species in the family Encyrtidae
 Avernes-Saint-Gourgon, in the Orne department
 Avernes-sous-Exmes, in the Orne department

See also 
 Avermes